Thomas William McDonald (1869 – 14 August 1968), sometimes known as Colonel Mac, was a United Party Member of Parliament in New Zealand.

Biography

McDonald was born in 1869 in Tasmania. From 1905 to 1907, he was Mayor of Lower Hutt.

He was married to Amy Gertrude McDonald and in 1914, they were living in Dunedin's Queen Street. Prior to World War I, he was Lieutenant Colonel and in charge of the Otago Infantry Battalion, which trained at Tahuna Park in Dunedin.  During the war, he rose to the rank of colonel, and was sometimes known as Colonel Mac. Having fought in Egypt, he returned to New Zealand before the end of the war due to sickness. He was one of the driving forces behind having a clubhouse established in Dunedin for the Returned Services' Association.

The death of Walter Powdrell triggered a by-election in the  electorate. McDonald announced his intention to stand for the Reform Party and travelled to Hawera. The Reform Party chose Edwin Dixon, the Mayor of Hawera, as their official candidate, and it was said that Clutha Mackenzie was the party's second preference. Consequently, McDonald left again without contesting the by-election. He was one of four candidates, stood as an independent, and came third with some 18% of the votes. He placed third out of four candidates.

McDonald died in 1968.

Notes

References

1869 births
1968 deaths
Mayors of Lower Hutt
New Zealand Liberal Party MPs
New Zealand military personnel of World War I
Australian emigrants to New Zealand
Members of the New Zealand House of Representatives
New Zealand MPs for North Island electorates
Unsuccessful candidates in the 1922 New Zealand general election
Unsuccessful candidates in the 1931 New Zealand general election
Unsuccessful candidates in the 1935 New Zealand general election
New Zealand Democrat Party (1934) politicians